Eubranchus rupium, the green balloon aeolid, is a species of sea slug or nudibranch, a marine gastropod mollusc in the family Eubranchidae.

Distribution
This species was described from Greenland. It is reported from the North Atlantic Ocean as far south as the Netherlands and is considered to be a circumpolar species. It is considered by most authors to be a synonym of Eubranchus olivaceus and is reported as far south as Monterey Bay, California on the Pacific Ocean coast of North America.

Biology
This nudibranch feeds on the hydroids Laomedea longissima.

References

Eubranchidae
Gastropods described in 1842